Rufus Fairchild Zogbaum (August 28, 1849 — October 22, 1925) was an American illustrator, journalist, and writer. He is primarily known as an illustrator for late 19th century news magazines. His works were regularly featured in Harper’s Weekly magazine.

Early life
Zogbaum was born in Charleston, South Carolina.  He was educated at the Art Students League in New York City from 1878–1879, and during 1880–1882 studied under Léon Bonnat in Paris.

Career
Harper's Weekly normally hired freelance illustrators; nevertheless, for a time Zogbaum was on the magazine's art staff and was sometimes given the assignment to redraw submissions by freelance illustrators. In the 19th-century news magazine world, redrawing illustrations was the equivalent of editing writers’ works. Two of the most famous artists who made illustrations for Harper’s were Winslow Homer and Frederic Remington, whose first few illustrations for Harper’s were redrawn by staff artists, including Zogbaum. Zogbaum and Rockwell both lived and worked in New Rochelle, New York, a well-known art colony especially popular among illustrators of the early twentieth century.

Rudyard Kipling referred to Zogbaum in a poem he sent to then-Captain (later Rear Admiral) Robley D. Evans, U.S. Navy, in 1896.

Specialization and influence

Zogbaum specialized in several areas of illustration. During his lifetime, his drawings and paintings of horses and military themes (U.S. Army and Navy) were almost as well known as Remington’s, although he was older than Remington and his works had actually influenced the younger artist. As did Remington, during the Spanish–American War, Zogbaum served as an on-the-scene artist-correspondent.  His 1897 book, All Hands: Pictures of Life in the United States Navy, is a collector's item featuring 36 full page illustrations. He painted a mural of the Battle of Lake Erie in 1910 for the Howard M. Metzenbaum U.S. Courthouse in Cleveland, Ohio.

Descendants
His son, Rufus F. Zogbaum, Jr., became an admiral in the U.S. Navy, and his grandson, Wilfrid Zogbaum (1915–1965), was a well-respected painter and sculptor who had teaching stints in several universities, including the University of California at Berkeley.

References

External links

The March Out, by Rufus Zogbaum (1885), used on the Ft. Davis National Historic Site website
The Prairie Letter Box, by Rufus Zogbaum (1887), with modern hand coloring, on the ‘’AmericanGallery’’ website
 Montana Cowboy by Rufus Zogbaum (1885) used to illustrate his article, A Day's Drive With Montana Cowboys in Harper's Magazine, July 1885, Volume 71, Issue 422
 Article by Rufus Zogbaum, Across Country with a Cavalry Column (1885),  showing four illustrations

American illustrators
1849 births
1925 deaths
Artists from New Rochelle, New York
Painters from New York City
Artists from Charleston, South Carolina
Painters from South Carolina
American male painters
19th-century American painters
19th-century American male artists
20th-century American painters
20th-century American male artists
Art Students League of New York alumni